Islam is the state religion in Bahrain.  Due to an influx of immigrants and guest workers from non-Muslim countries, such as India, the Philippines and Sri Lanka, the overall percentage of Muslims in the country has declined since the late 20th century. Bahrain's 2010 census indicated that 70.2% of the population is Muslim. The last official census (1941) to include sectarian identification reported 52% (88,298 citizens) as Shia and 48 per cent as Sunni of the Muslim population.

History

Prior to Islam, the inhabitants of Qatar and Bahrain practiced Arabian paganism. Islam swept the entire Arabian region in the 7th century.  Muhammad sent his first envoy Al-Ala'a Al-Hadrami to Munzir ibn Sawa Al Tamimi, the ruler of the historical region of Bahrain, which extended the coast from Kuwait to the south of Qatar including Al-Hasa, Qatif, and the Bahrain Islands, in the year 628 AD, inviting him to Islam. Munzir announced his conversion to Islam and all the Arab inhabitants of Bahrain and Qatar including some Persians living in Qatar also became Muslim, heralding the beginning of the Islamic era in Bahrain.

The origins of Shia Islam in Bahrain can be traced back to 656-661 AD, the caliphate reign of Ali ibn Abi Talib. The prophet Muhammad appointed Aban Ibn Sa'id Al As as governor of Bahrain during his lifetime. Aban was a major supporter of Ali's right to the caliphate, a position that was endorsed by the inhabitants of Bahrain including the influential Bani Abdul Qays tribe. The Khamis Mosque is believed to be the oldest mosque in Bahrain, with its origin dating back to the reign of Caliph Umar II.

The Ismaili Shia sect known at the Qarmatians seized Bahrain in 899 AD, making it their stronghold and base of operations. They raided Baghdad and in 930 sacked Mecca and Medina, desecrating the Zamzam Well with the bodies of Hajj pilgrims and taking the Black Stone with them back to Bahrain where it remained for twenty years. The Qarmatians were eventually defeated by the Abbasids in 976 and afterwards their power waned.

The defeat of the Qarmatian state saw the gradual wane of their revolutionary brand of Ismaili Islam. Instead, under a process encouraged by Sunni rulers over the next four hundred years, Twelver Shia Islam became entrenched. According to historian Juan Cole, Sunnis favoured the quietist Twelver branch of Shi'ism over the Qarmatians and promoted its development in Bahrain. In the 13th Century, there arose what was termed the 'Bahrain School', which integrated themes of philosophy and mysticism into orthodox Twelver practise. The school produced the theologians Sheikh Kamal al-Din Ibn Sa’adah al Bahrani (d. 1242), Sheikh Jamal al-Din ‘Ali  ---
ibn Sulayman al-Bahrani (d. 1271), and Sheikh Maitham Al Bahrani (d. 1280).

Today
Unofficial sources, such as the Library of Congress Country Studies, and The New York Times, estimate sectarian identification to be approximately 45% Sunni and 55% Shia. An official Bahraini document revealed that 51% of the country's citizens are Sunnis, while the Shiite population has declined to 49% of the Muslim population.

The country observes the Muslim feasts of Eid al-Adha, Eid al-Fitr, the Islamic Prophet Muhammad's birthday (Mawlid), and the Islamic New Year as national holidays.

"Political liberalisation" under King Hamad has seen Islamist parties contest Bahrain's elections and become a dominant force in parliament. Radical Sunni Islamist parties, the Salafi Asalah and the Muslim Brotherhood affiliated Al-Menbar Islamic Society are two of the largest parties in parliament, while the Shia Al Wefaq was expected to become the dominating party after 2006's general election having boycotted the 2002 poll. In the 2006 election Wefaq received the backing of the Islamic Scholars Council which helped it win seventeen of the eighteen seats it contested. In the 2010 election, they increased their representation by one seat, winning all the constituencies they contested, to take 18 of the 40 available parliamentary seats. Since then, Shias have no representatives in the Bahraini rubber stamp parliament.

The government has made concerted efforts to erode the Shiite citizen majority and tip the country's demographic balance in favor of the Sunni minority, mostly by recruiting foreign-born Sunnis to serve in the security forces and become citizens. Meanwhile, hundreds of Bahrainis have had their citizenship revoked in recent years, including a number of Shiite leaders and activists. Since 2011, the government has maintained a heavy security presence in primarily Shiite villages. Security personnel restrict the movements of Shiite citizens and periodically destroy their property.

See also
 Religion in Bahrain
 Beit Al Qur'an
 Muharram in Bahrain
 Rashid Al Marikhi

References

External links

 Bahrain Career Opportunities 
 US State Department
 Conspiring Against the Shia of Bahrain , Bahrain Center for Human Rights, October 2006
 Discrimination in Bahrain: The Unwritten Law , Bahrain Center for Human Rights, September 2003
 Video: Political Naturalization in Bahrain (2002) 
 At least Bahrain is trying to address Sunni-Shiite divisions, Daily Star editorial, 12 May 2006 (from Bahraini.tv website)